The 1969 Rothmans 12 Hour Classic was an endurance motor race for production cars held at the Surfers Paradise International Raceway in Queensland, Australia on 5 January 1969. It was the first of two such races to be held at the circuit.

The race was won by Bill Gates and Jim Bertram driving a Ford XT Falcon GT.

Classes
Cars competed in five classes based on the retail price of the vehicle in Australian Dollars.

Results

References

Further reading
 The Australian racing history of Ford, 1989
 Family Sedan Battle, The Courier Mail, Monday, 6 January 1969, page 1
 Stewart Wilson, The official racing history of Holden, 1988, pages 61 & 331
 Ford Scores at Surfer's 12 Hour, Australian Motor Manual, March 1969, page 27

Motorsport at Surfers Paradise International Raceway
Rothmans 12 Hour Classic
January 1969 sports events in Australia